AST, Ast, or ast may refer to:

Science and technology
 Attention schema theory, of consciousness or subjective awareness

Computing
 Abstract syntax tree, a finite, labeled, directed tree used in computer science
 Anamorphic stretch transform, a physics-inspired signal transform
 Andrew S. Tanenbaum (born 1944), American-Dutch computer scientist, sometimes identified as "ast" 
 Asynchronous System Trap, a mechanism used in several computer operating systems
 Application Security Testing, testing the operation and security of a software application
 Application Support Team, a team of Application Support Analysts supporting IT services delivered to users within an organisation, enabling the required operational processes needed for the business to be successful.

Medicine
 Aspartate transaminase, an enzyme associated with liver parenchymal cells

Mathematics
 Alternative set theory
 Alternating series test

Organizations
 Allied Security Trust, a patent holding company
 AST Research, a defunct personal computer manufacturer
 Association for Software Testing, US
 AST (publisher), a Russian book publishing company
 Arsenal Supporters' Trust, English football club supporters

Politics and government
 Abwehrstelle or Ast, the local intelligence center in each military district in Nazi Germany
 Alaska State Troopers, state police agency in Alaska, US
 Chadian Social Action, a former political party in Chad
 Office of Commercial Space Transportation, of the US FAA

Education
 ACT Scaling Test, for year 12 students, Australia
 Advanced Skills Teacher, a teaching role in England and Wales
 Air Service Training, a flight engineering training school
 American School in Taichung, an international school in Taichung, Taiwan
 American School of Tangier
 American School of Tegucigalpa
 American School of Tripoli
 Atlantic School of Theology, Halifax, Nova Scotia, Canada
 Avalanche Skills Training, Canada
 Conroe ISD Academy of Science and Technology, Texas, US

Transport
 Aldershot GO Station, Amtrak station code AST
 Astoria Regional Airport (FAA Identifier and IATA code AST), Clatsop County, Oregon, US
 Aston railway station (National Rail code), Birmingham, England

Time zones
 Atlantic Standard Time, UTC−4
 Alaska Standard Time, UTC−9
 Arabia Standard Time, UTC+3
 Antigua and Barbuda Time, UTC−4

Other uses
 Aviation Survival Technician, a US Coast Guard rating
 AST Research, Inc., as known as AST Computer, a personal computer manufacturer
 Asti, Italian province and city (was traditionally Ast in the Piemontese dialect)
 Assured shorthold tenancy, UK
 Asturian language (ISO 639 alpha-3: ast), Spain
 Astana Pro Team (UCI code AST), a professional road bicycle racing team
 Pat Ast, American actress and model (1941-2001)